Omar Vergara (6 April 1943 – 29 June 2018) was an Argentine fencer. He competed at the 1968, 1972 and 1976 Summer Olympics.

References

1943 births
2018 deaths
Argentine male fencers
Argentine épée fencers
Argentine foil fencers
Olympic fencers of Argentina
Fencers at the 1968 Summer Olympics
Fencers at the 1972 Summer Olympics
Fencers at the 1976 Summer Olympics
Pan American Games medalists in fencing
Pan American Games gold medalists for Argentina
Pan American Games bronze medalists for Argentina
Fencers at the 1963 Pan American Games
Fencers at the 1975 Pan American Games